Susan Jane Bradley (born 1940) is a Canadian psychiatrist best known for her work on gender identity disorder in children. She has written many journal articles and books, including Gender Identity Disorder and Psychosexual Problems in Children and Adolescents (with Kenneth Zucker) and Affect Regulation and the Development of Psychopathology. Bradley was chair of the DSM-IV Subcommittee on Gender Disorders.

Bradley served as Head of the Division of Child Psychiatry and was Psychiatrist-in-Chief at the Hospital for Sick Children and was consultant psychiatrist at the Clarke Institute of Psychiatry. She is a Professor Emerita in the Department of Psychiatry at University of Toronto and a fellow of the Royal College of Physicians.

Personal

Bradley was born in Niagara Falls, Ontario. She attended University of Toronto, earning a Bachelor of Science in 1962 and an M.D. in 1966. Prior to starting medical school, she worked for a year in India with CUSO.

Career
Bradley was certified in medicine in 1967. She earned her specialty licenses in psychiatry and child psychiatry in 1972. In the late 1970s, Bradley founded the Child and Adolescent Gender Identity Clinic at the Clarke Institute of Psychiatry. In collaboration with her co-author Zucker, she saw over 400 cases of children and adolescents with gender identity disorder and related issues. Bradley served the American Psychiatric Association DSM-IV Subcommittee on Gender Identity Disorders.

She was Clinical Director of the Department of Psychiatry from 1984 to 1988 and Psychiatrist-in-Chief and Head of the Division of Child Psychiatry at the University of Toronto from 1988 to 1998.

Bradley has argued that gender identity disorder in children is sometimes rooted in  serious family problems, underlying anxiety disorders or psychological trauma and might need other treatment than change of gender.

Because her therapeutic intervention for gender identity disorder in children is controversial, a 2007 celebration honoring Bradley's career was disrupted by transgender protesters.

Bradley's longstanding interest in parenting and evaluation of parenting programs led to her involvement in initiating The Parenting Alliance and the Infant Mental Health Promotion Project. The Council for Early Child Development named Bradley a Community Champion for her work developing the Early Years Centres.

Selected publications

According to the Web of Science Bradley has published over 50 articles in peer-reviewed journals. These articles and her books have been cited over 700 times, giving her an h-index of 16

 Gender identity disorder and psychosexual problems in children and adolescents, 1996, Guilford Press, with Kenneth J. Zucker
Affect regulation and the development of psychopathology, 2003, Guilford Press 
 "Physical Attractiveness of Girls with Gender Identity Disorder". 1996, The International Academy of Sex Research, Archives of Sexual Behavior, Vol. 25, No. 1

References

External links
Susan J. Bradley profile via Hospital for Sick Children

1940 births
Canadian psychiatrists
Canadian sexologists
Living people
People from Niagara Falls, Ontario
Transgender studies academics
University of Toronto alumni
Academic staff of the University of Toronto
Canadian women psychiatrists
Canadian expatriates in India